HMS Albion is an amphibious transport dock of the Royal Navy, the first of the two-ship . Built by BAE Systems Marine in Barrow-in-Furness, Albion was launched in March 2001 by the Princess Royal. Her sister ship, was launched in November 2001, also from Barrow. Affiliated to the city of Chester and based in Plymouth, she is the ninth ship to carry the name  (after Albion, an ancient name of Great Britain), stretching back to the 74-gun 1763 warship, and last carried by an aircraft carrier decommissioned in 1973 after 19 years service. Designed as an amphibious warfare ship, Albion carries troops, normally Royal Marines, and vehicles up to the size of the Challenger 2 main battle tank. She can deploy these forces using four Landing Craft Utility (LCUs) and four Landing Craft Vehicle and Personnel (LCVPs). A flight deck supports helicopter operations.

Albions future came under review as part of the 2010 Strategic Defence and Security Review. She was the fleet flagship from December 2010 until October 2011, and then again from March 2018 until January 2021.

Operational history
Ordered for the Royal Navy on 18 July 1996, Albion was constructed by BAE Systems Marine at its shipyard in Barrow-in-Furness, Cumbria. The first steel was cut on 17 November 1997, and the ships keel was laid down on 23 May 1998. The vessel was launched on 9 March 2001. She was commissioned into the Royal Navy on 19 June 2003 by her sponsor Anne, Princess Royal. The ship also carries a permanently embarked Royal Marines landing craft unit, 6 Assault Squadron, Royal Marines.

Along with sister ship Bulwark, Albion forms a key part of the Royal Navy's amphibious warfare capability. The ship can carry up to 256 soldiers in normal conditions, ordinarily Royal Marines. Albion can also carry their various associated armoured vehicles, up to the size of the Challenger 2 main battle tank. Vehicles can be deployed through an internal dock, using the ship's complement of four Landing Craft Utility (LCUs), while troops can be deployed from davits using four Landing Craft Vehicle and Personnel (LCVPs). Also equipped with a flight deck, the ship can operate two helicopters, with a third parked. CH-47s can sling-load RM BvS 10 Viking light tracked, amphibious armoured vehicles and deliver them ashore if the sea states are too severe for them to swim selves ashore.

2003–2011
In 2003, Albion was granted the Freedom of the City of Chester and also had a prominent role in the Queen's Colour Parade for the Royal Navy in Plymouth Sound; the third time a Fleet Colour has been given in the Royal Navy's history. In early 2004 the ship deployed on a multinational exercise for the first time, taking part in Exercise Joint Winter 04 off Norway, during which she completed her cold weather sea trials and was declared fully operational. Her next deployment was the Aurora exercises on the eastern seaboard of the United States. On 11 November 2004, the ship was sent to Ivory Coast to support Operation Phillis. Albion underwent a refit in early 2006, which included the installation of a new command, control, and communications suite.

Albion attended the HMNB Devonport Navy Days, 26–28 August 2006. Also in attendance was her sister ship, Bulwark, recently returned from the Lebanon evacuation. Ocean was unable to attend due to three sailors contracting tuberculosis; she was moved to HMNB Portsmouth.

During the Vela Deployment to West Africa, Albion acted as the Amphibious Task Group flagship. The deployment lasted from 11 September to 22 November 2006. Approximately 3,000 British personnel and 11 ships of the Royal Navy and Royal Fleet Auxiliary were involved. This deployment saw, for the first time, an Albion-class vessel taking part in amphibious operations with a  auxiliary landing ship dock, .

In late July and early August 2007, Albion was anchored off Sunderland during the city's air show.

In late 2008, Albion undertook her first refit, to upgrade various electronic and defence systems. During this docking period the Commanding Officer, Captain Wayne Keble, assumed command of Albions sister ship, Bulwark.

In April 2010, during the air travel disruption after the 2010 Eyjafjallajökull eruption, Albion was sent to Santander, Spain as part of Operation Cunningham to bring back soldiers from the third battalion The Rifles battlegroup, Royal Air Force personnel and stranded British citizens.

In late 2010, despite having been in commission for only seven years, the ship's future was uncertain, with either Albion or her sister ship Bulwark due to be put into extended readiness as a result of the 2010 Strategic Defence and Security Review.

In December 2010, Albion was announced as the next Royal Navy flagship and flagship of the UK Responsive Force Task Group, following the early decommissioning of the aircraft carrier , which occurred in March 2011, also as a result of the 2010 review.

In March 2011, Albion took part in Exercise Green Alligator with HQ of 3 Commando Brigade, the Joint Helicopter Command, the Royal Netherlands Marines Corps and 539 Assault Squadron RM. She was the main ship of the deployed Royal Navy Response Force Task Group. In May 2011, the Task Group took part in Exercise Cypriot Lion.

In June 2011, the ship had been redeployed along with the Response Force Task Group to the Gulf of Sidra off Libya to provide assistance to the ongoing NATO-led operation there. She subsequently continued on to the Indian Ocean, passing through the Suez Canal on 15 June, to assist with anti-piracy operations off the Horn of Africa.

On 20 September 2011, Albion docked at Liverpool Pier Head to celebrate her 10th Anniversary with a six-day stay. She was open to the public on the following Saturday and Sunday (24 & 25 September 2011). This was her second visit to Liverpool, having previously visited in March 2010.

Extended Readiness 2011–2017
In late 2011 Albion entered a state of "extended readiness" (joining the UK's equivalent to a Reserve Fleet), after Bulwark completed a major refit.

In order to cut the running costs of the Royal Navy, the 2010 Strategic Defence and Security Review concluded that one of the Royal Navy's two landing platform docks, Albion and Bulwark, should be placed into extended readiness while the other is held at high readiness for operations. Both vessels will alternate between extended readiness and high readiness throughout their service lives.

It was confirmed that Albion would be the first of the two vessels placed at extended readiness, for a cost of £2.5 million as Bulwark had recently finished a major refit. Running costs while in extended readiness were estimated to be £300,000 per annum in order to keep the vessel available for reactivation at short notice if needed.

In December 2014, Albion was moved into dry dock at Plymouth to allow her hull to be inspected and cleaned prior to the major work being undertaken to reactivate the ship. The major refit, plus the associated work up period, will take approximately 2.5 years, with Albion initially slated to assume the role of Fleet Flagship in April 2017.

The running costs of one of the Albion-class vessels at high readiness ranged from £17.7 million – £38.6 million per annum from 2007 to 2011.

Albions refit included the fitting of Phalanx CIWS in place of the Goalkeeper CIWS, a Type 997 radar and a new command system.

2017–present
Ship's staff moved back onboard Albion at the end of January 2017, formally taking responsibility for the ship from Babcock with the aim of taking Albion to sea for the first time in six years in summer 2017.

On 6 February 2018, Albion deployed for the first time since her refit to relieve Duncan as flagship of Standing NATO Maritime Group 2.

According to the Ministry of Defence, the planned out-of-service date for Bulwark is 2033. However, in October 2017, the BBC's Newsnight reported that the Ministry of Defence was considering decommissioning Albion and Bulwark, as part of a package of cost-cutting measures intended to mitigate the expense of the Royal Navy's two new aircraft carriers. This action was reversed by then Secretary of State for Defence Gavin Williamson in September 2018.

In April 2018, Albion was dispatched to the Asia-Pacific to assist in enforcing sanctions against North Korea.

On 4–6 February 2020, Albion hosted the crew of Uma, a 36-foot sailing yacht that is featured on the YouTube channel Sailing Uma. The Uma crew produced two episodes about their experiences on Albion.

In September 2020, Albion embarked on a unique deployment named Littoral Response Group eXperimental (LRG(X)). This would see the ship enter the Mediterranean with embarked Royal Marine Commando forces and Royal Naval personnel testing and developing pilot projects such as experimental unmanned aerial drones and autonomous vehicles for logistical and intelligence gathering purposes, in the operational environment. The deployment was the first that Albion had carried out with the full ships company remaining on board without leave, due to the Covid-19 pandemic.
 
On 27 January 2021, Albion transferred Fleet Flagship duty to HMS Queen Elizabeth (R08).

Affiliations
HMS Albion is affiliated with the following:
 City of Chester
 Mercian Regiment
 VII Squadron RAF
 C Squadron, Cheshire Yeomanry
 Worshipful Company of Brewers
 Claire House Children's Hospice
 Plymouth Albion RFC
 West Bromwich Albion FC
 HMS Albion, Bulwark & Centaur Association
 University Technical College Plymouth
 Sea Cadet Corps, TS Deva (Chester)
 Trinity School Combined Cadet Force
 Chester Royal Naval Association
 Chester City Club
 Chester Races

References

External links

 

Albion-class landing platform docks
Amphibious warfare vessels of the United Kingdom
Ships built in Barrow-in-Furness
2001 ships